Isotenes anisa is a species of moth of the family Tortricidae. It is found on Sumatra in Indonesia.

References

Moths described in 1983
Archipini